Deniz is a Turkish given name meaning "sea". It is used for both females and males.

Originally, Deniz was a masculine name. In a Turkish legend, the oldest Turkish ruler (Khan) Oğuz had six sons.  They were Ay-Han (moon Khan), Gök-Han (sky Khan), Deniz-Han (sea Khan), Yıldız-Han (star Khan), Gün-Han (sun Khan) and Dağ-Han (mountain Khan). 

Today, Deniz is a unisex name.

First name
 Deniz Aslan (born 1989), Turkish footballer 
 Deniz Aycicek (born 1990), Turkish-German footballer
 Deniz Aydoğdu (born 1983), Turkish footballer
 Deniz Aytekin (born 1978), German football referee of Turkish descent
 Deniz Barış (born 1977), Turkish retired footballer
 Deniz Baykal (born 1938), Turkish politician
 Deniz Baykara (born 1984), Turkish footballer
 Deniz Bozkurt (born 1993), Turkish-Puerto Rican footballer
 Deniz Çakır (born 1982), Turkish film and television actress
 Deniz Çınar (born 1984), Turkish yacht racer
 Deniz Dimaki (born 1977), Greek triathlete
 Deniz Doğan, German footballer
 Deniz Ertan (born 2004), Turkish swimmer
 Deniz Gezmiş (1947–1972), Turkish political activist
 Deniz Hakyemez (born 1983), Turkish volleyball player
 Deniz Hümmet (born 1996), Turkish footballer 
 Deniz Kadah (born 1986), Turkish footballer
 Deniz Kandiyoti (born 1944), Turkish feminist academic
 Deniz Khazaniuk (born 1994), Israeli tennis player
 Deniz Kılıçlı (born 1990), Turkish basketballer
 Deniz Koyu (born 1985), Turkish-German DJ and electronic dance music producer
 Deniz Kurtel, Turkish artist and electronic musician
 Deniz Kuypers, Dutch-American writer
 Deniz Mujić (born 1990), Austrian footballer of Bosnian descent
 Deniz Naki (born 1989), German footballer
 Deniz Nazar (born 1980), Ukrainian-born Turkish swimmer
 Deniz Orhun (born 1974), Turkish-American chef, media personality and businesswoman
 Deniz Seki (born 1970), Turkish pop singer
 Deniz Tek, Australian rock musician of Turkish descent
 Deniz Türüç (born 1993), Dutch-Turkish footballer 
 Deniz Yılmaz (born 1988), Turkish footballer
 Deniz Yücel (born 1973), German-Turkish journalist

Middle name
 Damla Deniz Düz (born 1995), Turkish water polo player
 Dilan Deniz Gökçek, Turkish football referee
 Nazlı Deniz Kuruoğlu (born 1960), Turkish ballet dancer and former beauty contestant

Fictional characters
 Deniz, in Follow Kadri, Not Your Heart

See also
 Deniz (surname), for notable people with this surname
 Denis of Portugal
 Denise (given name), pronounced similarly in French

Notes

Turkish unisex given names